Area codes in North America are given by national telephone numbering or for some countries by the multi-country North American Numbering Plan (NANP).
List of North American Numbering Plan area codes (+1)
Telephone numbers in Mexico (+52)
Telephone numbers in Greenland (+299)
Telephone numbers in Saint Pierre and Miquelon (+508)

See also
Original North American area codes
:Category:Telephone numbers by country